The 2008–09 Season of BAI Basket (31st edition) ran from November 20, 2008 through May 16, 2009, with 12 teams playing in three different stages: in stage one (regular season) teams played a double round robin system. In stage two, the six best teams played a single round robin tournament in serie A and the last six did the same for the consolation group, serie B. Finally, in stage three (final four) the best four teams from serie A played in a round robin at four rounds for the title. The winners of the regular season and of the serie A are awarded a bonus point for the serie A and the final four, respectively.

BAI Basket Participants (2008–09 Season)

Regular Season (November 20, 2008 - March 09, 2009

The home team is listed on the left-hand column.The rightmost column and the bottom row list the teams' home and away records respectively.

Regular Season Standings

Group Stage (March 20 – April 3, 2009)

Serie A

Serie B

The home team is listed on the left-hand column.The rightmost column and the bottom row list the teams' home and away records respectively.

Serie A

Serie B

Final Four (April 21 - May 16, 2009)

1º de Agosto vs. R. do Libolo

Petro Atlético vs. ASA

R. do Libolo vs. Petro Atlético

ASA vs. 1º de Agosto

R. do Libolo vs. ASA

1º de Agosto vs. Petro Atlético

Final standings

Group A

Group B

Group C

Awards
2009 BAI Basket MVP

2009 BAI Basket Top Scorer

2009 BAI Basket Top Rebounder

2009 BAI Basket Top Assists

See also
 2009 Angola Basketball Cup
 2009 Angola Basketball Super Cup
 2009 Victorino Cunha Cup

External links
Official Website 
Eurobasket.com League Page

References

Angolan Basketball League seasons
League
Angola